George F. A. Atherton (December 31, 1790 – April 23, 1882) was an American politician from Emerald Grove, Wisconsin, who served in the Wisconsin State Assembly after being elected to the 1st Wisconsin Legislature in 1848. He represented the Rock County towns of Bradford and Janesville.

Early life
Atherton was born in Chesterfield, New Hampshire, the son of Dr Oliver Atherton (17551812)  and Abigail Ladd (17651828). He is a direct descendant of James Atherton, one of the first settlers of New England; who arrived in Dorchester, Massachusetts, in the 1630s.

In the assembly 
Atherton was a Democrat. He was succeeded in the next session by Anson W. Pope, a Whig.

After the assembly 
Atherton was on the board of directors of the Madison and Beloit Railroad Company  when that board voted to change its name to the Rock River Valley Union Railroad Company in 1850. He remained on the board until 1854, when a complete reorganization took place. The railroad later became the Madison Division of the Chicago & Northwestern Railroad.

Personal
He served in the U.S. Army and married Ruthy Bartlett as "Major George F. A. Atherton" in Charlestown, New Hampshire, on October 7, 1818.

His son, George R. Atherton (18241910), represented Clinton in the 10th Wisconsin Legislature.

His daughter, Frances (18221900), married William Wallace White, the son of Phineas White.

He died in Burlington, Iowa, on April 23, 1882, and was buried at Aspen Grove Cemetery in Burlington.

References

External links

1790 births
1882 deaths
American railroad executives
Businesspeople from Wisconsin
People from Rock County, Wisconsin
Missing middle or first names
19th-century American politicians
19th-century American businesspeople
United States Army officers
Military personnel from Wisconsin
Democratic Party members of the Wisconsin State Assembly